Magdalene Louisa Pietersen (born November 1956) is a South African member of the National Assembly of South Africa from the African National Congress. She joined Parliament on 24 February 2022.

References 

Living people
1956 births
Members of the National Assembly of South Africa
African National Congress politicians
Women members of the National Assembly of South Africa
21st-century South African politicians
21st-century South African women politicians